Durley Street is a village in the City of Winchester district of Hampshire, England.

Governance
The village is part of the civil parish of Durley and is part of the Owslebury and Curdridge ward of the City of Winchester non-metropolitan district of Hampshire County Council.

References

Villages in Hampshire